Hurricane Danielle (also known as Ex-Hurricane Danielle in Europe) was a high-latitude Category 1 hurricane that persisted over the central Atlantic Ocean for nearly two weeks. The fourth named storm, and first hurricane of the 2022 Atlantic hurricane season, and the first windstorm of the 2022–23 European windstorm season, its formation ended an almost two-month-long period of tropical cyclone inactivity in the Atlantic basin.

Danielle remained over the open ocean as a tropical cyclone before dissipating off the coast of Portugal as an extratropical cyclone. The Azores and much of Portugal received heavy rain from the system. Overall, damage from Danielle was moderate.

Meteorological history 

On August 31, an area of low pressure formed along a decaying frontal zone over the central subtropical Atlantic. Later that day, the system slowed to nearly stationary as it was caught south of a blocking high, causing it to weaken back into a tropical storm by 06:00 UTC on September 3, due upwelled cooler waters. Later, Danielle drifted westward, escaping its cold wake. This move enabled the storm to re-strengthen into a Category 1 hurricane.

Deep-layer shear increased late that day, causing Danielle to weaken to a tropical storm by 06:00 UTC on September 8. From then through September 10, the cyclone made a counterclockwise loop over the open ocean while interacting with a deep-layer low moving eastward from Atlantic Canada.

Preparations and impact 

Large waves and heavy rain hit the Azores. Extratropical Danielle brought heavy rain to mainland Portugal. Between September 12–13, 644 accidents were reported throughout the country. Many downed trees and flash floods were reported. In Manteigas, floods and landslides caused major damage. Four vehicles were pulled into the Zêzere River. The municipality was under a "state of calamity" at the time, following intense summer forest fires in nearby areas of the Serra da Estrela mountain range, compounding the situation. Heavy rain extended to as far north as Braga. Covilhã saw  of rain while Viseu saw  of rain. Minor wind and flooding damage was reported in both Lisbon and Setúbal. One man was in serious condition when he was swept away and was under cardiac arrest. The mayor of Manteigas, Flavio Massano, stated that the damage was severe, quoting "Several vehicles were swept away by the force of the water, there are houses and businesses affected, roads, public lighting, water and sanitation infrastructures, sports and recreational equipment, among others". The Grândola Police Station had severe roof damage after Danielle hit. Civil Protection reported 380 emergency calls, and later on September 14, the number of calls had doubled. Yellow rainfall warnings were issued throughout Portugal due to Danielle. Many locations were hit by flooding, covering numerous roadways and damaging several bridges.

See also 
 Weather of 2022
 Tropical cyclones in 2022
 Timeline of the 2022 Atlantic hurricane season
 Other tropical cyclones named Danielle
 List of Azores hurricanes
 Tropical cyclone effects in Europe – Other former tropical storms that have affected Europe
 Hurricane Nadine (2012) – followed an erratic hurricane and produced hurricane-force gusts to parts of the Azores
 Hurricane Pablo (2019) – a Category 1 hurricane which took an identical track to Danielle until it curved northward

References 

D
2022 in Portugal
D
September 2022 events in Portugal
D